Stevie  Donohoe (born 28 February 1984) is an Irish jockey who competes in flat racing. He British Champion Apprentice in 2006.

The Athlone man won the title with 44 winners in 2006 and finished four ahead of his main challengers. He sealed the prestigious award with victory on a 14/1 shot, Show Trial, at Musselburgh Racecourse in Scotland.

Donohoe established himself as one of Ireland's most promising jockeys and by winning the Lester Award for Apprentice Jockey of the Year, he followed in the footsteps of the likes of Seb Sanders and Ryan Moore.

To date he has ridden close to 000 winners worldwide. Donohoe has also spent some time racing in California, began his career in Athlone under the guidance of the Derwin brothers before spending time with Gerry Moran, he then joined RACE in Kildare and began training under Christy Roche, Dave Evans and William Musson.

He has successfully competed all over the world in the most prestigious races including Dubai, Barbados, Saudi Arabia and the Breeders' Cup.

He won the Coventry Stakes at Royal Ascot breaking the track record on the two-year-old Rajasinghe.

Donohoe is a keen golfer, enjoys live music, and currently lives in Cambridge.

References

1984 births
Living people
Irish jockeys
Lester Award winners
British Champion apprentice jockeys